Subir Sachdev is Herchel Smith Professor of Physics at Harvard University specializing in condensed matter. He was elected to the U.S. National
Academy of Sciences in 2014, and received the Lars Onsager Prize from the American Physical Society and the Dirac Medal from the ICTP in 2018.
He was a co-editor of the Annual Review of Condensed Matter Physics from 2017-2019.

Sachdev's research describes the connection between physical properties of modern quantum materials and the nature of quantum entanglement in the many-particle wavefunction. Sachdev has made extensive contributions to the description of the diverse varieties of entangled states of quantum matter. These include states with topological order, with and without an energy gap to excitations, and critical states without quasiparticle excitations. Many of these contributions have been linked to experiments, especially to the rich phase diagrams of the high temperature superconductors.

Strange metals and black holes
Extreme examples of complex quantum entanglement arise in metallic states of matter without quasiparticle excitations, often called strange metals. Remarkably, there is an intimate connection between the quantum physics of strange metals found in modern materials (which can be studied in tabletop experiments), and quantum entanglement near black holes of astrophysics.

This connection is most clearly seen by first thinking more carefully about the defining characteristic of a strange metal: the absence of quasiparticles. In practice, given a state of quantum matter,  it is difficult to completely rule out the existence of quasiparticles: while one can confirm that certain perturbations do not create single quasiparticle excitations, it is almost impossible to rule out a non-local operator which could create an exotic quasiparticle in which the underlying electrons are non-locally entangled. Sachdev argued instead that it is better to examine how rapidly the system loses quantum phase coherence, or reaches local thermal equilibrium in response to general external perturbations. If quasiparticles existed, dephasing would take a long time during which the excited quasiparticles collide with each other. In contrast, states without quasiparticles reach local thermal equilibrium in the fastest possible time, bounded below by a value of order (Planck constant)/((Boltzmann constant) x (absolute temperature)). Sachdev proposed a solvable model of a strange metal (a variant of which is now called the Sachdev–Ye–Kitaev (SYK) model), which was shown to saturate such a bound on the time to reach quantum chaos.

We can now make the connection to the quantum theory of black holes: quite generally, black holes also thermalize and reach quantum chaos in a time of order (Planck constant)/((Boltzmann constant) x (absolute temperature)), where the absolute temperature is the black hole's Hawking temperature.
And this similarity to quantum matter without quasiparticles is not a co-incidence: for the SYK models, Sachdev had argued that the strange metal has a holographic dual description in terms of the quantum theory of black holes in a curved spacetime with 1 space dimension.

This connection, and other related work by Sachdev and collaborators, have led to valuable insights on the properties of electronic quantum matter, and on the nature of Hawking radiation from black holes. Solvable models of strange metals obtained from the gravitational mapping have inspired analyses of more realistic models of strange metals in the high temperature superconductors and other compounds. Such predictions have been connected to experiments, including some that are in good quantitative agreement with observations on graphene. These topics are discussed in more detail in  Research.

Resonating valence bonds and Z2 quantum spin liquids

P.W. Anderson proposed that Mott insulators realize antiferromagnets which could form resonating valence bond (RVB) or quantum spin liquid states with an energy gap to spin excitations without breaking time-reversal symmetry. It was conjectured that such RVB states have excitations with fractional quantum numbers, such as a fractional spin 1/2. The existence of such RVB ground states, and of the deconfinement of fractionalized excitations was first established by Read and Sachdev and Wen by the connection to a Z2 gauge theory. Sachdev was also the first to show that the RVB state is an odd Z2 gauge theory, as described in Research. An odd Z2 spin liquid has a background Z2 electric charge on each lattice site (equivalently, translations in the x and y directions anti-commute with each other in the super-selection sector of states associated with a Z2 gauge flux (also known as the m sector)). Sachdev showed that antiferromagnets with half-integer spin form odd Z2 spin liquids, and those with integer spin form even Z2 spin liquids. Using this theory, various universal properties of the RVB state were understood, including constraints on the symmetry transformations of the anyon excitations. Sachdev also obtained many results on the confinement transitions of the RVB state, including restrictions on proximate quantum phases and the nature of quantum phase transitions to them.

Career
Sachdev attended school at St. Joseph's Boys' High School, Bangalore and Kendriya Vidyalaya, ASC, Bangalore. He attended college at Indian Institute of Technology, Delhi for a year. He transferred to Massachusetts Institute of Technology where he received a B.S. in Physics. He received his Ph.D. in theoretical physics from  Harvard University. He held professional positions at Bell Labs (1985–1987) and at Yale University (1987–2005), where he was a Professor of Physics, before returning to Harvard, where he is now the Herchel Smith Professor of Physics. He has also held visiting positions as the Cenovus Energy James Clerk Maxwell Chair in Theoretical Physics  at the Perimeter Institute for Theoretical Physics, and the Dr. Homi J. Bhabha Chair Professorship at the Tata Institute of Fundamental Research. He has also been on the Physical Sciences jury for the Infosys Prize from 2018.

Honors
Elected to the American Academy of Arts and Sciences, 2019.
Honorary Fellow of the Indian Academy of Sciences, 2019.
Foreign Fellow of the Indian National Science Academy, 2019.
 Dirac Medal (International Center for Theoretical Physics), 2018; shared with Dam Thanh Son and Xiao-Gang Wen for "independent contributions towards understanding novel phases in strongly interacting many-body systems, introducing original transdisciplinary techniques". The citation reads:
Subir Sachdev has made pioneering contributions to many areas of theoretical condensed matter physics. Of particular importance were the development of the theory of quantum critical phenomena in insulators, superconductors and metals; the theory of spin-liquid states of quantum antiferromagnets and the theory of fractionalized phases of matter; the study of novel deconfinement phase transitions; the theory of quantum matter without quasiparticles; and the application of many of these ideas to a priori unrelated problems in black hole physics, including a concrete model of non-Fermi liquids.
Lars Onsager Prize (American Physical Society), 2018, to recognize outstanding research in theoretical statistical physics including the quantum fluids. The citation reads: 
for his seminal contributions to the theory of quantum phase transitions, quantum magnetism, and fractionalized spin liquids, and for his leadership in the physics community.
Dirac Medal for the Advancement of Theoretical Physics (University of New South Wales), 2015. The citation reads: 
The Dirac Medal was awarded to Professor Sachdev in recognition of his many seminal contributions to the theory of strongly interacting condensed matter systems: quantum phase transitions, including the idea of critical deconfinement and the breakdown of the conventional symmetry based Landau–Ginsburg–Wilson paradigm; the prediction of exotic 'spin-liquid' and fractionalized states; and applications to the theory of high-temperature superconductivity in the cuprate materials.
Elected to the U.S. National Academy of Sciences, 2014. The citation reads: 
Sachdev has made seminal advances in the theory of condensed matter systems near a quantum phase transition, which have elucidated the rich variety of static and dynamic behavior in such systems, both at finite temperatures and at T=0. His book, Quantum Phase Transitions, is the basic text of the field.
Abdus Salam Distinguished Lecturer, International Center for Theoretical Physics, Trieste, Italy, 2014.
Hendrik Lorentz Chair, Lorentz Institute, 2012.
Perimeter Institute for Theoretical Physics Distinguished Research Chair, 2009-14.
 John Simon Guggenheim Memorial Foundation Fellow, 2003.
 Fellow of the American Physical Society "for his contributions to the theory of quantum phase transitions and its application to correlated electron materials".
 Alfred P. Sloan Foundation Fellow, February 1989.
 LeRoy Apker Award Recipient, 1982.

Research

Quantum phases of antiferromagnets
Sachdev has worked extensively on the quantum theory of antiferromagnetism, especially in two-dimensional lattices. 
Some of the spin liquid states of antiferromagnets can be described by examining the quantum phase transitions out of magnetically ordered states. Such an approach leads to a theory of emergent gauge fields and excitations in the spin liquid states. It is convenient to consider two classes of magnetic order separately: those with collinear and non-collinear spin order.  
For the case of collinear antiferromagnetism
(as in the Néel state), the transition leads to a spin liquid with a U(1) gauge field, while non-collinear antiferromagnetism
has a transition to a spin liquid with a Z2 gauge field.

 The U(1) spin liquid is unstable at the longest length scales to the condensation of monopoles, and the Berry phases of the condensing monopoles lead to valence bond solid (VBS) order. 
  The Z2 spin liquid was shown to be stable, and this was the first realization of a stable quantum state with time-reversal symmetry, emergent gauge fields, topological order, and anyon excitations. The topological order and anyons were later identified with the e, m and ε particles of the toric code (see also the independent work of Xiao-Gang Wen).

Sachdev was the first to identify  that Z2 spin liquids come in two classes: `even' and `odd'. Half-integer-spin antiferromagnets can only realize odd Z2 spin liquids, which therefore provide a theory for Anderson's RVB state.
Odd Z2 spin liquids have (what is now called) an anomaly which constrains the symmetry transformations of the anyon excitations, and modifies the anyon condensation transition. An important consequence is that half-integer-spin antiferromagnets (and odd Ising gauge theories) do not have a trivial confining phase, as is required by extensions of the Lieb–Schultz–Mattis theorems. These results apply also to quantum dimer models and closely related models of bosons on the square lattice. This work is now the starting point of research in symmetry enriched topological (SET) order.

These results agree with numerous numerical studies of model quantum spin systems in two dimensions.

Turning to experiments, VBS order was predicted by this mechanism in SrCu2(BO3)2, and has been observed by neutron scattering.  A particular Z2 spin liquid state proposed for the kagome lattice antiferromagnet  agrees well with a tensor network analysis, and has been proposed to describe neutron scattering and NMR experiments on herbertsmithite. A gapped spin liquid state has also been observed in the kagome lattice compound Cu3Zn(OH)6FBr, and is likely to be a Z2 spin liquid.

Quantum criticality

Sachdev proposed that the anomalous dynamic properties of the cuprate superconductors, and other correlated electron compounds, 
could be understood by proximity
to a quantum critical fixed point. In the quantum critical regime of a non-trivial renormalization group 
fixed point (in higher than one spatial dimension)
the dynamics is characterized by the absence of quasiparticles, and 
a local equilibration time of order ħ/(kBT). This time was
proposed to be the shortest possible such time in all quantum systems. Transport measurements have since shown that this bound
is close to saturation in many correlated metals.
Sachdev has made numerous contributions to quantum field theories of quantum criticality in insulators, superconductors, and metals.

Confinement transitions of gauge theories, and deconfined criticality

Traditionally, classical and quantum phase transitions, have been described in terms of the Landau–Ginzburg–Wilson paradigm. The broken symmetry in one of the phases identifies 
as order parameter; the action for the order parameter is expressed as a field theory which controls fluctuations at and across the critical point.
Deconfined critical points describe a new class of phase transitions in which the field theory is not expressed in terms of the order parameter. Broken
symmetry and order parameters, or topological order, are present in one or both of the adjacent phases. The critical field theory is expressed in terms of deconfined fractionalized degrees of freedom
that cannot exist in isolation outside the sample.

Ising gauge theories:
Franz Wegner introduced Ising lattice gauge theories, and their transition between confining and deconfined phases, signaled by a change in the value of the Wilson loop of the gauge field
from area law to perimeter law. Wegner also argued that confinement transition of this theory had no local order parameter, but was instead described by a dual Ising model in 3 dimensions.
This conclusion turns out to need a crucial extension.  One of the implications of Sachdev's work on emergent gauge fields in two-dimensional antiferromagnets was that the deconfined phase of the 2+1 dimensional Ising gauge theory had Z2 topological order. The presence of topological order in one of the phases implies that this is an Ising* transition, in which we only select states and operators which are invariant under global Ising inversion; see a recent numerical study for observable consequences of this restriction. 
The Ising field represents a fractionalized excitation of the deconfined phase, the "vison" (or the m particle) carrying a quantum of Z2 gauge flux, and visons can only be created in pairs. The confinement transition is driven by the condensation of deconfined visons,  and so this is an example of a deconfined quantum critical point, although there is no gapless gauge field.

Odd Ising gauge theories:
The notion of deconfined criticality becomes more crucial in studying the confinement transitions of RVB states. These are described by deconfined phases of "odd" Ising gauge theories with Z2 topological order. (Wegner's Z2 gauge theory, which is "even", is not a satisfactory theory of the RVB state.) Now the critical theory has fractionalized excitations and a gapless gauge field.
In the context of two-dimensional antiferromagnets with half-integer spin per unit cell, the effective description in terms of Ising gauge theories requires
a background static electric charge on each site: this is the odd Ising gauge theory. We can write the Ising gauge theory as the strong coupling limit of 
a compact U(1) gauge theory in the presence of a charge 2 Higgs field. The presence of the background electric charges implies that the monopoles of the U(1) field carry Berry phases, and transform non-trivially under the space group of the lattice. As the monopoles condense in the confining phase, an immediate consequence is that the confining phase must break the space group by the development of valence bond solid (VBS) order. Furthermore, the Berry phases lead to suppression of monopoles at the critical point, so that, on the square lattice, the critical theory has a deconfined U(1) gauge field coupled to a critical charged scalar. Note that the critical theory is not expressed in terms of the VBS order as would be required by the LGW paradigm (which ignores the Z2 topological order in the deconfined phase). Instead, a dual version of the U(1) gauge theory is written in terms of a "square root" of the VBS order.

Onset of non-collinear antiferromagnetism:
Another example of deconfined criticality in two dimensional antiferromagnets appears in the condensation of particles with electric charges (the e particle, or the spinon) from the deconfined phase of the Z2 gauge theory. As the spinon also carries quantum numbers of global spin rotations, this leads to a "Higgs" phase of the Z2 gauge theory with antiferromagnetic order and broken spin rotation symmetry; here the antiferromagnetic order parameter has SO(3) symmetry, and so should the LGW critical theory; but the deconfined critical theory for the spinons has an exact SU(2) symmetry (which is further enlarged to O(4) after neglecting irrelevant terms).

Néel-VBS transition: A more subtle class of deconfined critical points has confining phases on both sides, and the fractionalized excitations present only at the critical point.
The best studied examples of this class are quantum antiferromagnets with SU(N) symmetry 
on the square lattice. These exhibit a phase transition from a state with collinear antiferromagnetic order to a valence bond solid, but the critical theory is expressed in terms of spinons
coupled to an emergent U(1) gauge field.
The study of this transition involved the first computation of  the scaling dimension of a monopole operator in a conformal field theory in 2+1 dimensions; more precise computations to order 1/N are in good accord with numerical studies of the Néel-VBS transition.

SYK model of non-Fermi liquids and black holes

Sachdev, and his first graduate student Jinwu Ye,  proposed an exactly solvable model of a non-Fermi liquid, a variant of which is now called the Sachdev–Ye–Kitaev model.
Its fermion correlators have a power-law decay, which was found to extend to a conformally invariant form at non-zero temperatures. The SYK model was also found  to have a non-zero entropy per site in the limit of vanishing temperature (this is not equivalent to an exponentially large ground state degeneracy: instead, it is due to an exponentially small many-body level spacing, which extends across the spectrum down to the lowest energies). Based on these observations, Sachdev first proposed that the model is holographically dual to quantum gravity on AdS2, and identified its low temperature entropy with the Bekenstein–Hawking black hole entropy. Unlike previous models of quantum gravity, it appears that the SYK model is solvable in a regime which accounts for the subtle non-thermal correlations in the Hawking radiation.

One-dimensional quantum systems with an energy gap

Sachdev and collaborators developed a formally exact theory for the non-zero temperature dynamics and transport of one-dimensional quantum systems with an energy gap. The diluteness of the quasiparticle excitations at low temperature allowed the use of semi-classical methods. The results were in good quantitative agreement with NMR 
and subsequent neutron scattering observations on S=1 spin chains, and with NMR on the Transverse Field Ising chain compound CoNb2O6

Quantum impurities
The traditional Kondo effect involves a local quantum degree of freedom interacting with a Fermi liquid or Luttinger liquid in the bulk. Sachdev described cases where the bulk was a strongly-interacting critical state without quasiparticle excitations. The impurity was characterized by a Curie susceptibility of an irrational spin, and a boundary entropy of an irrational number of states.

Ultracold atoms

Sachdev predicted density wave order and 'magnetic' quantum criticality  
in tilted lattices of ultracold atoms. This was subsequently observed in experiments. The modeling of tilted lattices inspired a more general model of interacting bosons in which a coherent external source can create and annihilate bosons on each site. This model exhibits density waves of multiple periods, along with gapless incommensurate phases, and has been realized in experiments on trapped Rydberg atoms.

Metals with fractionalization and emergent gauge fields

Sachdev and collaborators proposed a new metallic state, the fractionalized Fermi liquid (FL*): 
this has electron-like quasiparticles around a Fermi surface, enclosing a volume distinct from that required by Luttinger's theorem.
A general argument was given that any such state must have very low energy excitations on a torus, not related
to the low energy quasiparticles: these excitations are generally related to the emergent gauge fields of an associated
spin liquid state. In other words, a non-Luttinger Fermi surface volume necessarily requires topological order. 
The FL* phase must be separated from the conventional Fermi liquid (FL) by a quantum phase transition;
this transition need not involve any broken symmetry, and examples were presented involving confinement/Higgs 
transitions of the gauge field. Such a quantum phase transition has been observed in CeCoIn5.

Quantum critical transport

Sachdev developed the theory of quantum transport at non-zero temperatures in the simplest model system without quasiparticle
excitations: a conformal field theory in 2+1 dimensions, realized by the superfluid-insulator transitions of ultracold bosons
in an optical lattice. A comprehensive picture emerged from quantum-Boltzmann equations, the operator product
expansion, and holographic methods. The latter mapped the dynamics to that in the vicinity of the horizon of a black hole.
These were the first proposed connections between condensed matter quantum critical systems, hydrodynamics, and quantum gravity. These works eventually led to the theory of hydrodynamic transport in graphene, and the successful experimental predictions described below.

Quantum matter without quasiparticles

Sachdev developed the theory of magneto-thermoelectric transport in 'strange' metals: these are
states of quantum matter with variable density without quasiparticle excitations. Such metals are found,
most famously, near optimal doping in the hole-doped cuprates, but also appear in numerous other correlated
electron compounds. For strange metals in which momentum is approximately conserved, a set of hydrodynamic equations were proposed in 2007, describing two-component transport
with momentum drag component and a quantum-critical conductivity.
This formulation was connected to the holography of charged black holes, memory functions, and new field-theoretic approaches. 
These equations are valid
when the electron-electron scattering time is much shorter than the electron-impurity scattering time,
and they lead to specific predictions for the density, disorder, temperature, frequency, and magnetic field dependence
of transport properties. 
Strange metal behavior obeying these hydrodynamic equations was predicted in graphene, in the 'quantum critical'
regime of weak disorder and moderate temperatures near the Dirac density.
The theory quantitatively describes measurements of thermal and electrical
transport in graphene, and points to a regime of viscous, rather than Ohmic, electron flow.
Extensions of this theory to Weyl metals pointed out the relevance of the axial-gravitational anomaly, and made predictions for thermal transport which were
confirmed in observations (and highlighted in the New York Times).

Phases of the high temperature superconductors

High temperature superconductivity appears upon changing the electron density away
from a two-dimensional antiferromagnet. Much attention has focused on the intermediate regime between
the antiferromagnet and the optimal superconductor, where additional competing orders are found at
low temperatures, and a "pseudogap" metal appears in the hole-doped cuprates. Sachdev's theories for the evolution
of the competing order with magnetic field, density, and temperature have been successfully compared with experiments. Sachdev and collaborators proposed a sign-problem free Monte Carlo method for studying the onset of antiferromagnetic order in
metals: this yields a phase diagram with high temperature superconductivity similar to that found in many materials, and has led to much subsequent work describing the 
origin of high temperature superconductivity in realistic models of various materials.
Nematic order was predicted for the iron-based superconductors, and
a new type of charge density wave, a d-form factor density wave, was predicted for
the hole-doped cuprates; both have been observed in numerous experiments.
The pseudogap metal of the hole-doped cuprates
was argued to be a metal with topological order, as discussed above, based partly on its natural connection to the d-form factor density wave. Soon after, the remarkable experiments of Badoux et al. displayed evidence for a small Fermi surface state with topological order near optimal doping in YBCO, consistent with the overall theoretical picture presented in Sachdev's work.

References

External links
 
 List of Publications on the arXiv
 
 YouTube channel of Subir Sachdev with video lectures

Living people
Harvard University faculty
20th-century Indian physicists
MIT Department of Physics alumni
Harvard University alumni
IIT Delhi alumni
Indian theoretical physicists
Members of the United States National Academy of Sciences
Foreign Fellows of the Indian National Science Academy
American academics of Indian descent
Scientists from Bangalore
Kendriya Vidyalaya alumni
Sloan Research Fellows
Indian condensed matter physicists
Fellows of the American Physical Society
1961 births
Indian scholars